Mitchell Kowalski (1915–1971) was a Polish-American actor.

He was the son of Mr. and Mrs. John Kowalski of Jackson, Michigan.

Kowal's Broadway credits include Collector's Item (1952), Gramercy Ghost (1951), and Horse Fever (1940). In the 1940s, he was active in stock theater in the eastern United States.

In 1951, Kowal married Elayne Lingelbach in New York.

Kowal died in Fürnitz, Austria, in a train accident on 8 May 1971.

Filmography

1944: See Here, Private Hargrove - Minor Role (uncredited)
1944: Marriage Is a Private Affair - Minor Role (uncredited)
1945: That Night with You - Man in Alley (uncredited)
1947: Cass Timberlane - Doorman at Country Club (uncredited)
1950: The Lone Ranger (TV Series) - Mack
1953: Your Favorite Story - Eddie
1953: Violated - Mack McCarthy
1954: The Public Defender (TV Series) - Detective Jones
1954: Rails Into Laramie - Worker (uncredited)
1954: River of No Return - Prospector (uncredited)
1954: Stories of the Century (TV Series) - Sheriff Bill Joad
1954: Francis Joins the WACS - Patrol Leader (uncredited)
1954: Rogue Cop - Guard (uncredited)
1954: Four Star Playhouse (TV Series) - 2nd Reporter
1954: Deep in My Heart - Oscar Hammerstein II (uncredited)
1954: The Silver Chalice - Rioter (uncredited)
1954: Day of Triumph - Minor Role (uncredited)
1955: Crown Theatre with Gloria Swanson (TV Series) - Lawyer
1955: The Cisco Kid (TV Series) - Johnny Nestor / Wounded henchman
1955: Jupiter's Darling - Sentry (uncredited)
1955: The Big Bluff - Coroner
1955: Abbott and Costello Meet the Mummy - Policeman (uncredited)
1955: The Kentuckian - Frontier Postman (uncredited)
1955: Medic (TV Series) - Bartender / Gardner
1956: The Great Locomotive Chase - One of Andrews' Raiders (uncredited)
1956: Red Sundown - Henchman (uncredited)
1956: Dragnet (TV Series)
1956: Great Day in the Morning - Mower - Northern Loyalist (uncredited)
1957: Maverick (TV Series) - Fred Callahan
1957: Official Detective (TV Series) - Samka
1957-1958: Tombstone Territory (TV Series) - Slim / Deputy Steve
1957-1960:  Have Gun – Will Travel (TV Series) - 2nd Cowboy / Jesse
1958: The Restless Gun (TV Series) - Waco
1958: Live Fast, Die Young - 4th Hobo (uncredited)
1958: Man Without a Gun (TV Series)
1958: The Rough Riders (TV Series) - Buffer
1959: Al Capone - Hood (uncredited)
1959: John Paul Jones - Capt. Saltonstall
1959: The Jayhawkers! - Governor's Aide (uncredited)
1962: Le pillole di Ercole
1962: Jadą goście, jadą - Mike O'Rawiec
1963: 55 Days at Peking - US Marine (uncredited)
1963: Vacation Playhouse (TV Series)
1970: FBI – Francesco Bertolazzi investigatore (TV Mini-Series) - Harry Blake
1970: Dzięcioł - Edward Ździebko
1971: I Hate Mondays  (Nie Lubię Poniedziałku) - Mróz (final film role)

References

External links
 
 Photo Mitchell Kowal
  Mitchell Kowal
  Mitchell Kowal
  Mitchell Kowal

1915 births
1971 deaths
American male film actors
American male television actors
American people of Polish descent
20th-century American male actors